Rosswald is a car-free village in the Swiss Alps, located in the canton of Valais. It lies in the eastern part of the canton, in the Simplon region, at an altitude of 1,819 metres. The village sits on a sunny terrace overlooking the Rhone valley, above Ried-Brig. The village is accessible via a cable car from the latter town.

Rosswald is a winter sports resort and includes a small ski area.

References
Swisstopo topographic maps

External links
Official website
Rosswald on Wanderland.ch

Villages in Valais
Ski areas and resorts in Switzerland
Car-free villages in Switzerland